"Caminito" is a tango with music by Juan de Dios Filiberto and lyrics by Gabino Coria Peñaloza.

Widely known and readily identifiable throughout Argentina and neighboring Uruguay, the lyrics are in themselves a classically structured poem with strophes made up of two verses and one refrain:

References

External links
 Caminito interpreted by Basil Billow, on SoundCloud

Spanish-language songs
1926 songs
Carlos Gardel songs
Tangos